Long Point is an unincorporated area in Fort Bend County, Texas, United States. There is no road sign identifying the community, though the nearby roads carry its name. Petroleum and sulphur were extracted near the community in the 1930s. Electric transmission towers pass through the site and a county landfill is located to the northeast.

History
According to local lore, Long Point was named for a point of timber that jutted into the prairie near the site. The Texas State Handbook says that a community was founded here in 1850 on land formerly owned by Stephen F. Austin. The name was written initially as Longpoint, but was changed to Long Point by the first postmaster, Wayne Bishop on February 19, 1851.

Noted botanist Gideon Lincecum lived on a nearby plantation he named Mount Olympus from 1848 to 1874. He and his son Lysander practiced medicine in the community. In December 1860 Gideon and Sam Lauderdale, both veterans of the War of 1812, supported the local secession movement by leading a march of the Long Point Minutemen from Mount Vernon (Washington County) to Brenham

The Civil War caused economic hardships in this part of Texas, but no battles between Union and Confederate forces occurred. The area recovered quickly. By the 1880s, Long Point had a school, a church, a broom factory, a commercial section, and industries processing the area's cotton, corn, and lumber. The population reached an estimated 500 in 1880.

By 1936, sulphur was mined nearby and the settlement had its own school. The community was served by the Gulf, Colorado and Santa Fe Railway and a paved road. That year, the Long Point oilfield was discovered east of the settlement and continued to operate as late as 1987.

However, the Gulf, Colorado and Santa Fe Railway constructed a line that ran through Gay Hill, Texas and started the economic decline of Long Point. In 1890, the population of Long Point was only 146, and remained at that level through 1960. It dropped to about 80 people in 1970 and remained at that level through the 2000 census. The town post office closed in 1907.

Geography
Though Long Point is not marked on road signs, it is preserved in the naming convention of the roads that intersect there. FM 361, which goes northwest from Long Point toward Fairchilds, is also named Fairchilds-Long Point Road. FM 1994, which runs from northeast to southwest, is also called Whaley-Long Point Road to the northeast and Guy-Long Point Road as it runs southwest toward Guy. A county landfill forms a prominent hill  to the northeast of the intersection of the two farm to market roads. Electric transmission towers pass overhead within a few feet of the road intersection. The towers originate at the W. A. Parish power plant in Thompsons and go to the southwest. An abandoned railway right-of-way parallels the transmission towers. FM 1994 is nearly parallel to the transmission towers and passes under them exactly at the intersection with FM 361.

Education
Long Point is located in the Needville Independent School District. Needville High School serves the community.

See also
 Farm-to-Market Road
 Needville, Texas

Notes

References

Unincorporated communities in Texas
Unincorporated communities in Fort Bend County, Texas